Dubove (Dubovoe or Dubovoye) is an urban-type settlement situated in the Carpathian Mountains in Tiachiv Raion, Zakarpattia Oblast of western Ukraine.  While officially designated as an urban-type settlement, Dubove's character and composition more closely resembles that of a village.  Population: .

History

The area once known as Subcarpathia, which includes present-day Dubove (originally settled as Dombo), was part of the Kingdom of Hungary from the 10th century until 1919.  Located in the county of Máramaros, Dombo gained prominence in 1755 when it became the site of the district's forestry office, which drew skilled lumberjacks and their families from Bohemia.  Following the end of World War I in 1919, Subcarpathia, including Dombo, was annexed by the newly created Czechoslovak Republic and was given its current name, Dubove, a derivative of the Slavic word for oak tree (дуб).  During World War II, Dubove was occupied by pro-Nazi Hungary.  In 1930, 706 (or nearly 16%) of Dubove's 4,416 inhabitants were Jewish.  But by the end of World War II, virtually all of the Jews had been exterminated.  The Red Army occupied Dubove in 1945 and the village was officially incorporated into the Soviet Union the following year.  In 1969, Dubove became home to a major Soviet plant, the Zakarpattia Helicopter Production Enterprise, creating an influx of new settlers and eventually raising the population of the village to over 10,000.  By far the largest employer in the area, the factory was responsible for funding several projects in the village, including a stadium and technical school.  But after the fall of the Soviet Union in 1991, the factory laid off roughly 5,000 workers and Dubove fell on hard times.  Although the factory still creates helicopters today, most of its resources are devoted to producing commercial airplane seats, satellite antennas, and children's sleds.

Geography

Dubove is located approximately halfway along the path of the River Teresva.  It is regarded as the economic center of the tri-village area, which includes Ganichi and Kalyny.

Nearby villages
 Krasna - north 5.6 km
 Ust'-Chorna (Királymező in Hungarian and Königsfeld in German) - north 15 km
 Kalyny - south 3 km
 Ganichi - south 6 km
 Neresnytsya - southwest 10.4 km

Nearby towns
 Tiachiv - southwest 37 km
 Khust - southwest 70 km
 Mukachevo - southwest 120 km

Education

Dubove has one technical school, one secondary school, three primary schools, and a music school.

Demographics

The majority of the inhabitants are Ukrainian, with Russian, Hungarian, and Roma minorities.

References

External links
Dubove Web Site
Photos of Dubove

Urban-type settlements in Tiachiv Raion
Holocaust locations in Ukraine